The Lupar River is a river in Sarawak, Malaysia. The river mouth is located in between Sebuyau and Kampung Teriso, in Sri Aman Division.

Overview
The Lupar River flows from the Klinkang Range towards the South China Sea. The river flows 275 kilometers and is the third longest river in Sarawak, after the Rajang River and Baram River.

Notable settlements
Notable settlements along the Lupar River, arranged from the mouth to upriver are:
Sebuyau
Kampung Teriso
Lingga
Simanggang
Engkilili

Natural attractions
Tidal bore
The tidal bore, known locally as benak is a unique natural phenomenon in which the incoming tide form waves as high as three meters that travel up the river against the current. The Lupar River is among 56 places in the world where the tidal bore has been observed.

The Benak Festival is held annually along the bank of the Lupar River in Sri Aman. Besides water-based events, the festival also features Miss Tourism Benak and Ratu Kebaya Benak, singing competitions and food bazaars, traditional games, a trade expo with sale of local produce, an exhibition on the tidal bore in Batang Lupar and a showcase of traditional Iban, Malay and Chinese wedding ceremonies.

Wildlife
Crocodile attacks
The Lupar River is infamously known for its crocodile attacks. Between 1900 and 2017, 22.2% of crocodile attacks in Sarawak are recorded in the Lupar Basin, the highest in the state.

These crocodile attacks became the source of local legend and mythology, named Bujang Senang (happy bachelor) which refers to a 19 ft-crocodile that inhabited the Lupar River. The colloquial name of "bujang" means someone who is a champ, a great person, and it is a sign of respect while “Senang” refers to the Senang River, one of the tributaries of the Lupar River where the first known attack by this crocodile had happened. In popular culture, the name Bujang Senang (the Crocs) was adopted as the nickname of the state’s football team Sarawak FA.

References

Rivers of Sarawak
Rivers of Malaysia